Preston C. Lorick House, also known as the Lorick-Baker House, is a historic home located at Columbia, South Carolina. It was built before 1840, and remodeled in the late 1800s in the Late Victorian style. It is a two-story, frame dwelling, with a wraparound portico. The house features decorative brackets under all eaves and gingerbread woodwork. It was the home of Governor John Lawrence Manning during his term of office from 1852 to 1854.

It was added to the National Register of Historic Places in 1972.

References

Houses on the National Register of Historic Places in South Carolina
Victorian architecture in South Carolina
Houses completed in 1840
Houses in Columbia, South Carolina
National Register of Historic Places in Columbia, South Carolina